CSI: Fatal Conspiracy is a video game based on the CSI: Crime Scene Investigation television series. It is the ninth CSI game released.  It was released on 26 October 2010 (along with a companion Nintendo DS game CSI: Unsolved) on Microsoft Windows, PlayStation 3, Xbox 360 and Wii.

The game corresponds with the 10th season of the television series and includes the return of Sara Sidle.

A team of writers from the show were involved in the game's script, and Laurence Fishburne reprised his role from the television program.

Gameplay

Case 1: Flash Baked
A burned out building turns into another crime scene when the player locates a dead body in it belonging to a woman named Portia Weismann who was the spa's manager. Sara Sidle is the player's partner in this case. The suspects are Brian Reed, victim's ex-boyfriend and Pedro Baxa, the spa owner.

Case 2: Planting Evidence
A construction worker named Mark Ensign is found dead in the center of a construction site. Greg Sanders is the player's partner in this case. During the case, the victim is found to be depressed and suicidal. The suspects are Zachary Lynch, the construction supervisor, Marcus Kunchai, a plumber who is the victim's friend and Todd Stuart, a gardener and a supposed eco-terrorist.

Case 3: Tapped Out
A burn victim named Mary Marst becomes the victim of a homicide when her medical equipment is found to have been sabotaged.  Nick Stokes gets paired with the player. The suspects are John Barrett, victim's step-brother, Jayne Barrett, victim's step-sister and Pauline Liu, victim's hospice nurse.

Case 4: All Washed Up
A temp secretary named Jessica Marnier was found dead in her car at a car wash. The suspects are Veronica Carver, victim's best friend and housemate, Will Rice, victim's wealthy boyfriend and Manuel Molinez, a man who is the boyfriend's best friend and on parole. The player works with Catherine Willows on this case.

Case 5: Boss Fight
The cases worked on lead up to the climax of the game's main storyline.  Dr. Raymond Langston is the player's partner on this case. This case has two parts as there are two murders with one belonging to Manuel Molinez (suspect from the previous case) and the other belonging to Agent Gene Huntby. The main focus of the case is directed towards Beatriz Salazar and a sergeant named Timothy Lipp.

Reception

Fatal Conspiracy was met with mixed reception upon release.  GameRankings and Metacritic gave it 53.33% and 47 out of 100 for the PC version; 47.50% and 42 out of 100 for the Xbox 360 version; and 40% and 39 out of 100 for the PlayStation 3 version.

References

External links
Official site

2010 video games
Adventure games
Fatal Conspiracy
Detective video games
PlayStation 3 games
Telltale Games games
Ubisoft games
Video games about police officers
Video games developed in the United States
Video games set in the Las Vegas Valley
Wii games
Windows games
Xbox 360 games